Triplophysa dongganensis is a species of stone loach in the genus Triplophysa. It is endemic to Guangxi, China. This species reaches a length of

References

dongganensis
Freshwater fish of China
Endemic fauna of China
Taxa named by Yang Jian
Fish described in 2013